Roger Morgan Spanswick (June 24, 1939 – February 12, 2014) was a Professor of Biological and Environmental Engineering at Cornell University and an important figure in the history of plant membrane biology.

Personal life

Roger Morgan Spanswick was born on June 24, 1939 in Barford St. John and St. Michael, Oxfordshire, England. He was the son of Lucy and Arthur Spanswick. Roger married Helen Walker in 1963. Andrew Spanswick and Robert Spanswick are their sons. Roger died at his hillside home overlooking Cayuga Lake on February 12, 2014. His gravestone in Pleasant Grove Cemetery in Ithaca, New York has the phrase only connect from the book Howards End engraved on it.

University life

In 1960 Roger graduated from the University of Birmingham with an honours degree in physics. He received a Diploma in Biophysics with Jack Dainty and then a Ph.D. in Biophysics with E. J. Williams at the Department of Biophysics in the University of Edinburgh in 1964. Roger then moved to Cambridge University where he was Enid MacRobbie’s first postdoc. Enid MacRobbie reported that Roger played a huge part in the development of the Plant Biophysics group, and his legacy and legend lasted for years.  It was one of the best and most stimulating periods in my group said Enid and Roger played a key role in this.  
Roger Spanswick joined the plant physiology group at Cornell University that included André Jagendorf, Rod Clayton, and Peter J. Davies. Roger became an Assistant Professor of Plant Physiology in 1967, an Associate Professor in 1973, and a Full Professor in 1979. Roger Spanswick was a Guggenheim Fellow in 1980-81 and made a Fellow of the American Association for the Advancement of Science (AAAS) and the World Innovation Foundation in 2004. Roger was a great mentor and an active member of the Friday Lunch Club, which included A. Carl Leopold, Randy Wayne and Michael Rutzke. A symposium celebrating his life was held at Cornell University on June 2, 2014. Spanswick's unfunded grant proposals, which are rich in ideas, as well as his personal collection of materials concerning the history of the Genomics Initiative are available in the Cornell University Archives (collection number #21-51-4251).

Research

Roger's highly cited research focused on various aspects of ion transport. He proved the presence of an electrogenic ion pump in plant cells. Subsequent biochemical work led to the identification of proton transport ATPases at the plasma membrane and vacuolar membranes. Along with Christopher Faraday, he discovered a membrane skeleton in plants.

Enid MacRobbie characterized Roger Spanswick’s scientific legacy as follows: Roger made major contributions to our understanding of basic ion transport processes in plants, and was a true pioneer. He was both a very original thinker and a very versatile, thorough and careful experimentalist. He initiated a revolution in our understanding of ion transport in plant cells. His demonstration (in 1972) that the most important transport system in the plasmalemma of Characean cells is a proton-pumping ATPase, generating membrane potentials well negative of the potassium equilibrium potential, was a major advance… Previously plant physiologists had assumed that plant cells were like animal cells, with an ATP-dependent sodium-potassium exchange pump as the major process of active ion transport. There was opposition to this new view, but by the time of his review in the 1981 Annual Review of Plant Physiology further experimental work made it clear that he was right. In the period of the 1970s and 1980s he continued to make major contributions to the new thinking. He showed that two distinct proton pumping ATPases were present in plasmalemma and tonoplast, with different inhibitor characteristics. He also showed that the gradients of pH and membrane potential generated by the primary proton pump in the plasmalemma could be used to drive secondary active transport of other solutes, sugars, amino acids and other ions. Thus his original idea led to a very large volume of experimental work, in which he also had a major input, and the consequence was a revolution in the field. He later went on to work successfully on more applied problems over a wide range of topics, but it is important to recognize the lasting legacy of his work in the field of basic ion transport.

Spanswick also pioneered the use of electrophysiological methods to investigate intercellular transport through plasmodesmata.

Books
Spanswick, R. M., W. J. Lucas, and J. Dainty, eds. Plant Membrane Transport: Current Conceptual Issues: proceedings of the international workshop held in Toronto, Canada, July 22–27, 1979 Elsevier/North-Holland Biomedical Press, Amsterdam

References

Obituaries
 Roger Morgan Spanswick, Ithaca Journal, February 14, 2014 
 Segelken, H. R. Professor Roger Spanswick dies at 74, Cornell Chronicle, February 13, 2014 
Hu, S. Professor Spanswick Remembered as 'Pioneer', Cornell Daily Sun, February 14, 2014 
 Roger M.Spanswick, June 24, 1939 – February 12, 2014, The Newsletter of the American Society of Plant Biologists January/February 2015 
Roger M. Spanswick, Biophysical Society Newsletter January 2015

External links
Department of Biological and Environmental Engineering, Roger Spanswick

1939 births
2014 deaths
Cornell University
Cornell University faculty